Zeuxidia masoni is a species of butterfly of the family Nymphalidae. It is found in Burma, the Mergui Archipelago (Kadun Kyung) and Thailand.

References

Butterflies of Indochina
Zeuxidia